Didj may refer to:

 Didgeridoo, an Australian wind instrument
 Leapfrog Didj, a handheld game console made by LeapFrog Enterprises
 Suzanne Nelson